Adam Khan and Durkhani is a classic Pashtun romance which has been called the Pashto Romeo and Juliet along with Yusuf Khan and Sherbano. 

Adam Khan hailed from Bazadara Bala (a village in Malakand, Khyber Pakhtunkhwa) and Durkhanai was from Bazadara Payan. It is considered a classic in the Pashto literature.

References

Pakistani folklore
Pashtun culture
Sufi literature